The United States Wightman Cup team was the more successful team in the Wightman Cup tennis competition. The team won 51 titles out of 61 participations.

History
The United States won the inaugural Wightman Cup in 1923. They won 51 out of 61 titles, including a run of nine straight titles between 1931 and 1939 before World War II, another run of twelve straight titles between 1946 and 1957, and a further run of eleven straight titles between 1979 and 1989.

Members of the inaugural team
 Hazel Hotchkiss Wightman
 Eleanor Goss
 Molla Mallory
 Helen Wills

Members of the last team
 Jennifer Capriati
 Patty Fendick
 Mary Joe Fernández
 Lori McNeil
 Betsy Nagelsen

See also

Wightman Cup
United States Fed Cup team
United States Davis Cup team

Wightman Cup
United States